Okaya & Co., Ltd. (岡谷鋼機) is one of the oldest still functioning Japanese trade concerns. It was founded in Nagoya city in 1669 under the name Sasaya (笹屋) and later established as Okaya in 1937. It is a family business more than 200 years and became the Henokiens association member.

It is the 48th on the list of World’s Oldest Family Companies.

See also 
Henokiens

References 

Article contains translated text from 岡谷鋼機 on the Japanese Wikipedia retrieved on 1 May 2017.

External links 
Homepage
Location on Google Maps.

Foreign trade of Japan
Companies based in Nagoya
Companies established in 1669
17th-century establishments in Japan
Japanese brands
Japanese companies established in 1937
Trading companies established in the 17th century